Saint-Gelven is a former commune in the Côtes-d'Armor department of Brittany in northwestern France. On 1 January 2017, it was merged into the new commune Bon Repos sur Blavet.

Population
Inhabitants of Saint-Gelven are called saintgelvenois in French.

See also
Communes of the Côtes-d'Armor department

References

External links

Former communes of Côtes-d'Armor